The molecular formula C8H8O4 (molar mass : 168.15 g/mol, exact mass : 168.042259 u) may refer to:

 Dehydroacetic acid
 3,4-Dihydroxyphenylacetic acid
 2,6-Dimethoxy-1,4-benzoquinone
 Homogentisic acid
 4-Hydroxymandelic acid
 5-Methoxysalicylic acid
 Norcantharidin
 Orsellinic acid
 Quinolacetic acid
 Trihydroxyacetophenones
 Gallacetophenone (2,3,4-trihydroxyacetophenone)
 2,4,6-Trihydroxyacetophenone
 Vanillic acid

Molecular formulas